Bridgewater High School is a coeducational secondary school, located over two sites in Appleton, Warrington, Cheshire. The current principal is Keiron Powell, with Tracey Hatton as Head Teacher.

History
The school was formed in 1987 by the amalgamation of Appleton Hall County Grammar School and Stockton Heath County High School. Appleton Hall became the new school's Lower Site, while Stockton Heath (known locally as Broomfields after the attached leisure centre) became the Upper Site.

The school previously held specialist Arts College status with additional specialisms in Science and Maths. It consistently achieves good GCSE results. The most recent OFSTED inspection judged the school to be Outstanding.

The school converted to academy status on 1 December 2014, and is now part of the multi-academy trust TCAT (The Challenge Academy Trust).

Uniform
The uniform is a white shirt, grey trousers or skirt, navy blazer with school badge attached and correct tie, differing per year group. Optionally, a navy blue cardigan or sweatshirt can also be worn. The compulsory P.E kit is a blue polo shirt and blue shorts for gymnastics, cross country and football, and royal blue rugby shorts and a blue and red long sleeved top for rugby. Girls may wear gymnastics shorts or skirts for netball.

Timetable
The timetable at Bridgewater has been changed recently now form time is in the morning, as opposed to in the afternoon. However, form time is only on a Monday and Wednesday. The school works off a two-week timetable to accommodate top set languages classes that are taught French and German as opposed to just French among other things. The school day begins at 08:45 with all students needing to be on site by 08:40 this is followed by form time and two lessons or two lessons. After this there is break which lasts 15 minutes followed by a further two lessons after this year 7 and pupils on early lunch have a 45-minute lunch while all other pupils have a 35-minute lunch.  After this pupils attend their final lesson concluding the school day at 15:00 however many excellent after school clubs are run which finish at 16:00.

Banding system
The pupils are split into two bands, Stockton and Appleton. In years 7, 8 and 9 pupils typically have lessons with other members of their band.
In the GCSE years (10 & 11), two additional bands are introduced (independently of the original two), L and K. Pupils are split between the two bands for compulsory lessons (P.E and PSHE), but GCSE lessons are independent of this. 
In these two years, the original Stockton and Appleton are observed only for assemblies and pastoral periods.
Pupils of Appleton and Stockton are indicated by the pattern of stripes on their ties. Stockton has one repeated stripe, whilst Appleton has two stripes close together, then repeated along the tie. The stripes are different colours depending what year the pupil is in. The ties are moved down each year, so that a year seven pupil will be wearing the same colour tie for the following years. This allows staff to easily identify what year a pupil is in.

Links and exchanges
In the past, the school has been linked with Soweto High School which is situated in Johannesburg, South Africa, with an exchange between pupils and teachers taking place.

The school continues to take part in pupil exchanges to Martha's Vineyard, and Germany.

References

External links
Bridgewater High School

Secondary schools in Warrington
Academies in Warrington